The following is a list of Michigan State Historic Sites in Iron County, Michigan. Sites marked with a dagger (†) are also listed on the National Register of Historic Places in Iron County, Michigan.


Current listings

See also
 National Register of Historic Places listings in Iron County, Michigan

Sources
 Historic Sites Online – Iron County. Michigan State Housing Developmental Authority. Accessed January 23, 2011.

References

Iron County
State Historic Sites
Tourist attractions in Iron County, Michigan